The various tones of the color coral are orange, red and pink representations of the colors of those cnidarians known as precious corals.

The web color coral is a shade of orange.  It is displayed at the upper right. Other modern color schemes use different shades of orange or red.

The first recorded use of coral as a color name in English was in 1513.

Variations of coral

Coral red

The color coral red is displayed at right.

Coral pink

The color coral pink is displayed at right, a pinkish color.

The complementary color of coral pink is teal. The first recorded use of coral pink as a color name in English was in 1892. Late in 2016, the color sample was renamed Coral Red by Pantone, as the RGB, hex and HTML color table showed the same color as being reddish, standing against popular belief of pinkish. 

Still today, some people call Coral Red as Coral Pink due to this old attribution.

The normalized color coordinates for coral pink are identical to Congo pink, which was first recorded as a color name in English in 1912.

Light coral

The web color light coral is a pinkish-light orange color as displayed to the right. It is also a HTML/CSS color name and a X11 color name.

See also 
 RAL 3016 Coral red
 List of colors

References

Shades of orange
Shades of pink
Shades of red